Nikola Popara (born 8 March 1992) is a Bosnian professional footballer who plays as a defensive midfielder for Bosnian Premier League club Radnik Bijeljina.

Honours
Vojvodina
Serbian Cup: 2013–14

Radnik Bijeljina
Republika Srpska Cup: 2018–19

References

External links

1992 births
Living people
People from Trebinje
Serbs of Bosnia and Herzegovina
Association football midfielders
Bosnia and Herzegovina footballers
Bosnia and Herzegovina youth international footballers
FK Teleoptik players
FK Spartak Subotica players
FK Vojvodina players
FK Jagodina players
FC Biel-Bienne players
FC Stade Nyonnais players
FK Budućnost Podgorica players
FK Radnik Bijeljina players
Serbian First League players
Serbian SuperLiga players
Swiss Challenge League players
Montenegrin First League players
Premier League of Bosnia and Herzegovina players
Bosnia and Herzegovina expatriate footballers
Expatriate footballers in Serbia
Bosnia and Herzegovina expatriate sportspeople in Serbia
Expatriate footballers in Switzerland
Bosnia and Herzegovina expatriate sportspeople in Switzerland
Expatriate footballers in Montenegro
Bosnia and Herzegovina expatriate sportspeople in Montenegro